The 2021 FIA European Rallycross Championship was the 46th season of the FIA European Rallycross Championship. The championship consisted of two classes: RX1 and RX3.
The championship began on 22 May at the Circuit de Spa-Francorchamps in Belgium, and ended on 4 September at Circuit de Lohéac in France.

Calendar
The championship consisted of 6 events across Europe, with RX1 competing at four rounds and RX3 competing at five.
The initial calendar was released on 16 December. It included one unconfirmed event.
A revised calendar was released on 26 March.
Another calendar revision was published on 12 May.

Calendar Changes
After being cancelled due to the COVID-19 pandemic, the Euro RX of Benelux, Euro RX of Norway and Euro RX of France were all set to return to the championship on the initial calendar. The Euro RX of Norway was not included in the 12 May revision of the calendar.
The Euro RX of Finland was set to return to the championship for the first time since 2014 on the initial calendar, but was not included in the 12 May revision.
After being on the calendar in 2020, the Euro RX of Riga - Latvia was not included in the initial calendar, but was later added to the calendar in the May 12 revision.
After being on the original 2020 calendar, then being cancelled by the COVID-19 pandemic, the Euro RX of Portugal, Euro RX of Russia and Euro RX of Germany were not included in the initial calendar. The Euro RX of Portugal and the Euro RX of Germany were reintroduced on the revised calendar.

Series News
The Supercar and Super1600 classes were renamed to RX1 and RX3 respectively.

Entries

RX1

RX3

Championship standings
Points are scored as follows:

RX1

RX3

Notes

References

External links

European Rallycross Championship seasons
European Rallycross Championship
Rallycross Championship